Sepiapterin reductase is an enzyme that in humans is encoded by the SPR gene.

Function 

Sepiapterin reductase (7,8-dihydrobiopterin:NADP+ oxidoreductase; EC 1.1.1.153) catalyzes the NADPH-dependent reduction of various carbonyl substances, including derivatives of pteridines, and belongs to a group of enzymes called aldo-keto reductases. SPR plays an important role in the biosynthesis of tetrahydrobiopterin.

Reaction 

Sepiapterin reductase (SPR) catalyzes the chemical reaction

L-erythro-7,8-dihydrobiopterin + NADP+  sepiapterin + NADPH + H+

Thus, the two substrates of this enzyme are L-erythro-7,8-dihydrobiopterin and NADP+, whereas its three products are sepiapterin, NADPH, and a single hydrogen ion (H+).

This enzyme belongs to the family of oxidoreductases, to be specific, those acting on the CH-OH group of donor with NAD+ or NADP+ as acceptor. The systematic name of this enzyme class is 7,8-dihydrobiopterin:NADP+ oxidoreductase. This enzyme participates in folate biosynthesis.

Clinical significance 

Mutations of the SPR gene may cause sepiapterin reductase deficiency, a rare disease. The clinical phenotype can include progressive psychomotor retardation, altered tone, seizures, choreoathetosis, temperature instability, hypersalivation, microcephaly, and irritability. Patients with sepiapterin reductase deficiency also manifest dystonia with diurnal variation, oculogyric crises, tremor, hypersomnolence, oculomotor apraxia, and weakness. Response to treatment is variable and the long-term and functional outcome is unknown. To provide a basis for improving the understanding of the epidemiology, genotype/phenotype correlation and outcome of these diseases their impact on the quality of life of patients, and for evaluating diagnostic and therapeutic strategies a patient registry was established by the noncommercial International Working Group on Neurotransmitter Related Disorders (iNTD).

References

Further reading

External links 
 
 

EC 1.1.1
NADPH-dependent enzymes
Enzymes of known structure